Grizzly Butte small shield volcano located in northwestern British Columbia, Canada. It is Holocene in age and stands in relief above the surrounding area north of the Nazcha Creek and comprises the West Tuya lava field with West Vent and Volcano Vent. It is one of the three small shield volcanoes in the Tuya Volcanic Field which in turn form part of the Northern Cordilleran Volcanic Province.

See also

 List of volcanoes in Canada
 Volcanism of Western Canada

References

Volcanoes of British Columbia
One-thousanders of British Columbia
Shield volcanoes of Canada
Monogenetic shield volcanoes
Holocene shield volcanoes
Stikine Plateau
Cassiar Country